The V Constitutional Government was the fifth Constitutional Government (administration or cabinet) under the Constitution of East Timor.  Formed on 8 August 2012, it was led by the country's fifth Prime Minister, Xanana Gusmão, and was replaced by the VI Constitutional Government on 16 February 2015.

Composition
The government was made up of Ministers, Vice Ministers and Secretaries of State, as follows:

Ministers

Vice Ministers

Secretaries of State

References

Notes

Further reading

External links
Program of the V Constitutional Government – Government of East Timor

Cabinets established in 2012
Cabinets established in 2015
Constitutional Governments of East Timor
2012 establishments in East Timor
2015 disestablishments in East Timor